The 1986 French motorcycle Grand Prix was the eighth round of the 1986 Grand Prix motorcycle racing season. It took place on the weekend of 19–20 July 1986 at the Paul Ricard Circuit.

Classification

500 cc

References

French motorcycle Grand Prix
French
Motorcycle Grand Prix